William Henry Hawkins (1861 – 10 August 1930) was a New Zealand cricketer and Liberal Party Member of Parliament.

Work
Hawkins was born in New South Wales and moved to the Wairarapa at the age of 20 to take up journalism. He eventually became editor and manager of the Pahiatua Herald. After losing his parliamentary seat he moved to Tataraimaka in Taranaki, where he took up farming.

Cricket
Hawkins played 17 first-class matches for Auckland and Hawke's Bay between 1887 and 1896. He was a wicket-keeper who also sometimes bowled left-arm medium pace. He captained Hawke's Bay in their match against Wellington in 1887-88.

Politics

Hawkins won the Pahiatua electorate in a 1904 by-election after the death of John O'Meara; but was defeated in the next election in 1905. In World War I he served overseas in the 14th Reinforcement with the rank of captain. On his return he joined the staff of the prohibitionist organisation the New Zealand Alliance.

Death
Hawkins died in New Plymouth on 10 August 1930, and he was buried at Te Henui Cemetery. He was survived by his widow, whom he had married in 1894, and their four sons and a daughter.

References

1861 births
1930 deaths
New Zealand cricketers
Auckland cricketers
Hawke's Bay cricketers
New Zealand Liberal Party MPs
New Zealand military personnel of World War I
Unsuccessful candidates in the 1905 New Zealand general election
New Zealand MPs for North Island electorates
Burials at Te Henui Cemetery